Lake Te Anau is in the southwestern corner of the South Island of New Zealand. It is the largest lake in Australasia by fresh water volume.

The main body of the lake runs north-south, and is 65 km in length. Three large fiords form arms to the lake on its western flank: North Fiord, Middle Fiord and South Fiord. These are the only inland fiords that New Zealand has, the other 14 are out on the coast. Several small islands lie in the entrance to Middle Fiord, which forks partway along its length into northwest and southwest arms. The surface of the lake is at an altitude of 210 m. It has a maximum depth of 417 m, so much of its bed lies below sea level, with the deepest part of the lake being 226 metres below sea level.

Several rivers feed the lake, of which the most important is the Eglinton River, which joins the lake from the east, opposite the entrance to North Fiord. The outflow is the Waiau River, which flows south for several kilometres into Lake Manapouri. The town of Te Anau lies at the south-eastern corner of the lake, close to the outflow.

Most of the lake is within Fiordland National Park and the Te Wahipounamu World Heritage Site, the latter of which was officially recognised internationally in 1990. Other than the Te Anau township, the only human habitation close to the lake is the farming settlement of Te Anau Downs, close to the mouth of the Eglinton River. Between these two settlements the land is rolling hill country, but elsewhere the land is mountainous, especially along its western shore, where the Kepler and Murchison Mountains rise 1,400 m above the surface of the lake.

Lake Te Anau was important for the Ngai Tahu iwi in pre-European times as the area was a traditional stopping point on their trails between the east and west coasts of the South Island of New Zealand, where they obtained food and resources. The lake was first discovered by European explorers Charles Naim and William Stephen in 1852.

Two New Zealand Great Walks start at the lake. The Milford Track starts at the northern tip of the lake and the Kepler Track starts and ends at the south tip of the lake at the Waiau River.

Name
The English translation of the Maori name Te Anau has been disputed. It was supposed by many that Te Anau was the name of the granddaughter of Hekeia, a chief of the Waitaha tribe, whose name now belongs to a mountain on the Longwood Range. When the Te Ana-au Caves were rediscovered in 1948, earlier explanations of the name were replaced by the interpretation of the full name Te Ana-au, Maori for 'The cave of swirling water'.

Flora and fauna
Numerous species of wildlife and vegetation are found in the watershed of Lake Te Anau. Vegetative understory includes numerous fern species including the crown fern, Blechnum discolor.

Several species of endangered birds live around the shores of Lake Te Anau, notably the takahē (Notornis hochstetteri). An area between the Middle and South Fiords called the Murchison Mountains is a sanctuary set aside for these birds. The western shore of the lake also features the Te Ana-au Caves.

Recreation
Throughout summer the lake is used for boating, fishing, kayaking, swimming and access to Fiordland National Park. The lake is home to both the Marakura Yacht Club and the Te Anau Boating Club. Every year on the weekend of Labour Day a fishing competition is held.

See also
 List of lakes in New Zealand

Notes

References

Sources
 
 C. Michael Hogan. 2009. Crown Fern: Blechnum discolor, Globaltwitcher.com, ed. N. Stromberg

External links 
 

Lakes of Fiordland
Lake